Melastoma denticulatum is a species of flowering plant in the family Melastomataceae, native from the Solomon Islands to the south Pacific.

Taxonomy
Melastoma denticulatum was first described by Jacques Labillardière in 1825. Its acceptance as a distinct species has varied. It is accepted by Plants of the World Online, . It has also been treated as a synonym of Melastoma malabathricum and Melastoma affine, and also as misapplied to Melastoma affine.

References

denticulatum
Flora of the Solomon Islands (archipelago)
Flora of the Pacific
Plants described in 1825